Ramón Neptuno Abella Caside (16 February 1922 – 1989) was a Uruguayan water polo player. He competed in the 1948 Summer Olympics.

References

1922 births
1989 deaths
Water polo players at the 1948 Summer Olympics
Uruguayan male water polo players
Olympic water polo players of Uruguay
Sportspeople from Montevideo